Azatrephes paradisea is a moth of the subfamily Arctiinae first described by Arthur Gardiner Butler in 1877. It is found in Brazil and French Guiana.

References

Phaegopterina
Moths of South America
Moths described in 1877